Polypedates braueri is a species of frog in the family Rhacophoridae. It is endemic to Taiwan. It has also been introduced to Guam.

References

braueri
Amphibians of Taiwan
Amphibians described in 1911
Taxa named by Theodor Vogt